Hemisection may refer to:

 Tooth hemisection
 Damage to half of the spinal cord, leading to Brown-Séquard syndrome